The County Hound EP is the debut extended play (EP) by American rapper Cashis. It was released on May 22, 2007, by Shady Records and Interscope Records. The EP was released to promote his planned album, Loose Cannon (which was subsequently shelved), and to bring attention to him as an artist. Eminem produced or co-produced the whole album except for a single song, which he also serves as the executive producer. It sold 6,700 copies its first week of release and debuted on the Billboard 200 at number 106.

Cashis's second studio album entitled as The County Hound 2, was released independently on October 15, 2013 through Bogish Boy Entertainment, as a sequel.

Release and promotion
Cashis first made his mark appearing on the single "You Don't Know" on Eminem's compilation album, Eminem Presents: The Re-Up (2006), performing solo on the songs "Everything Is Shady" and "Talkin' All That". His solo track "Talkin' All That" was praised by Complex as an album standout.

In May 2007, Cashis released the eight-track The County Hound EP in an attempt to have people "fiend" for his music, or garner interest in it. The album was released as a limited edition EP.

Cashis first solo video "'Lac Motion" gained MTV airplay, with no promotion, which prepared the way for Cashis's debut album, Loose Cannon.

Music and songs
On The County Hound EP, Cashis hits listeners with vignettes from the life of a hustler ("That Nigga's Gangsta," "Gun Rule," and "Pistol Poppin"), remorseful self-examination ("Ms. Jenkins"), and reflections on life and death in the rap industry ("Thought of Suicide"). Eminem produces five of The County Hound EP's eight cuts and spits a guest verse alongside Cashis on "Pistol Poppin". Rikanatti, Keno, Luis Resto, Mike Elizondo and Ron Browz round out the production team.

Critical reception 

The EP was met with mixed reviews upon its release from music critics. Some critics praised it as a solid introduction to Cashis, however others put down the gangster themes of the album's tracks. Hip-hop magazine PopMatters gave the album a 7/10 (Stars) rating, saying "First appearing on last year’s release, Eminem Presents: The Re-Up, this new addition to the Shady Records roster is now formally introduced with a throwback to the full-length EP format. Eminem’s hands at production for five of The County Hound EP’s eight total tracks are very obvious though he appears vocally only for a guest verse on “Pistol Poppin’”, and production from the likes of up-and-comers like Rikanatti make this less of an Eminem show than we’re accustomed to. Lyrics of reflection and self-examination on tracks like “Thoughts of Suicide” and “Ms. Jenkins” suggest that Cashis may actually be able to talk his way out of the traditional trap of the superstar's shadow. It's a solid introduction".

Commercial performance
The County Hound EP debuted at number 106 on the US Billboard 200, with 6,700 copies sold in its first week. The EP peaked at number one on the Top Heatseekers, at number 14 on the Top Rap Albums, and at number 37 on the Top R&B/Hip-Hop Albums.

Track listing 

Notes
 signifies an additional producer.
"County Hound" (Intro) contains additional vocals by Stevion "Big Box" Boyd.

Sample credits
"Ms. Jenkins" contains elements of "Bohemian Rhapsody", written by Freddie Mercury and performed by Queen.

Personnel
Credits for The County Hound EP adapted from AllMusic.

 Jeff Bass – bass, guitar, keyboards
 Jules Bass – composer
 Ron Browz – producer
 Tony Campana – engineer
 Cashis – primary artist
 DJ Arcane – engineer
 Mike Elizondo – producer
 Eminem	– executive producer, guest artist, mixing, primary artist, producer
 Steve King – bass, guitar
 Dart Parker – A&R
 Luis Resto – keyboards, producer

Charts

See also
 The County Hound 2

References

2007 EPs
Cashis albums
Albums produced by Eminem
Albums produced by Ron Browz
Shady Records EPs
Gangsta rap EPs